Novy is a rural locality (a settlement) in Beryozovsky Selsoviet, Pervomaysky District, Altai Krai, Russia. The population was 400 as of 2013. There are 54 streets.

Geography 
Novy is located 10 km east of Novoaltaysk (the district's administrative centre) by road. Solnechnoye is the nearest rural locality.

References 

Rural localities in Pervomaysky District, Altai Krai